Anhui University of Finance and Economics (AUFE), founded as Anhui Institute of Finance and Trade in 1959, is a university in Bengbu, Anhui Province, China.

Campuses
AUFE has a total area of 701,000 square metres and comprises three campuses: Longhu Lake East, Longhu Lake West, and Jiaotong Road. The Longhu Lake East Campus and the Longhu Lake West Campus are on the two sides of the Longhu Lake, a national AAAA-class scenic district.

Its library holds 1.8 million volumes, 0.52 million electronic volumes, and 1,700 Chinese and foreign periodicals. The university facilities include laboratories, research centers, swimming pools, gymnasia, and playgrounds.

Organization 
AUFE consists of thirteen schools, two departments, three university-affiliated and ten school-affiliated research institutions. The University awards bachelor's degrees in 41 academic disciplines, master's degrees in two Level I academic disciplines and 28 Level II academic disciplines. In addition, three special programs are offered: MBA, JM, master’s degrees for on-post college teachers. The university has four Key Research Bases at provincial or ministerial level, one A-class and four B-class key disciplines at provincial level, three state-level characteristic undergraduate majors, two provincial-level characteristic undergraduate majors, four provincial-level demonstration majors, two provincial-level demonstration centers for experimental teaching, and 28 provincial-level quality courses.

College and schools
 School of Economics
 School of Finance
 School of International Economics and Trade
 School of Management
 School of Business
 School of Accountancy
 School of Finance and Public Administration
 Faculty of Law
 School of Information Engineering
 School of Statistics and Applied Mathematics
 School of Foreign Languages
 School of Literature, Art and Media
 School of Politics

Research Centers and institutes
 Rural Economic and Social Development Research Institute
 Circulation of Economic Research Research Institute
 Government and Non-profit organization Accounting Institute
 International law International Tax Law Research Center
 Accounting Financial Development and Research Center
 Logistics and Supply Chain Management Research Center
 Enterprise Information Management Research Institute
 Applied Mathematics Research Institute
 Applied Statistics Research Institute
 History and Culture Research Institutions (HCRI)
 Research Center of Rural Public Policies (RCRPP)
 Research Center of Consumer’s Behavior (RCCB)
 Research Center of SOE Management (RCSM)
 Research Center of Entrepreneurship and Business Growth (RCEBG)
 Research Institution of Trade and Industry Development (RITID)
 Research Institution of Modern Finance (RIMF)
 Research Institution of Company Economy
 Research institutions of economies at county level
 Cotton Project Research Institution
 Economic Research Center

Faculty 
There are over 1,070 professional teachers and 115 of them are full professors and 335 of them associate professors.

External links
 Official website of AUFE

Universities and colleges in Anhui
Business schools in China
Educational institutions established in 1959
Bengbu
1959 establishments in China